Nikita Sergeyevich Guslistov (born 30 May 2002) is a Russian professional ice hockey player for Severstal Cherepovets of the Kontinental Hockey League (KHL).

Playing career
Guslistov made his professional debut for Severstal Cherepovets during the 2020–21 season. At 18-years old, 242 days, he became the youngest player ever to captain a KHL team, surpassing the previous record held by Vladimir Tarasenko. He also became the youngest player to ever score a hat-trick for Cherepovets. He was drafted in the seventh round, 209th overall, by the Carolina Hurricanes in the 2021 NHL Entry Draft.

International play
Guslistov played for Russia at the 2022 World Junior Ice Hockey Championships. He played two games before the tournament was cancelled and voided due to the COVID-19 pandemic.

Career statistics

References

External links

2002 births
Living people
Carolina Hurricanes draft picks
People from Cherepovets
Russian ice hockey forwards
Severstal Cherepovets players
Sportspeople from Vologda Oblast